Phycitodes is a genus of snout moths described by George Hampson in 1917.

Species
Phycitodes albatella (Ragonot, 1887)
Phycitodes albistriata Hampson, 1917
Phycitodes arenicola (Chrétien, 1911)
Phycitodes binaevella (Hübner, 1813)
Phycitodes delineata (T. P. Lucas, 1892)
Phycitodes eliseannae P. Leraut, 2002
Phycitodes gallicella P. Leraut, 2002
Phycitodes inquinatella (Ragonot, 1887)
Phycitodes lacteella (Rothschild, 1915)
Phycitodes maritima (Tengström, 1848)
Phycitodes melanosticta (Lower, 1903)
Phycitodes mucidella (Ragonot, 1887)
Phycitodes nigrilimbella (Ragonot, 1887)
Phycitodes olivaceella (Ragonot, 1889)
Phycitodes osteella (Ragonot, 1887)
Phycitodes reliquellum (Dyar, 1904)
Phycitodes saxicola (Vaughan, 1870)
Phycitodes subcretacella (Ragonot, 1901)

References

Phycitini
Pyralidae genera